Following is a list of dams and reservoirs in West Virginia.

All major dams are linked below.

Dams and reservoirs in West Virginia

This list is incomplete.  You can help Wikipedia by expanding it.

 Beech Fork Dam, Beech Fork Lake, United States Army Corps of Engineers
 Belleville Locks and Dam, on the Ohio River, USACE (on the Ohio border)
 Bluestone Dam, Bluestone Lake, USACE
 Brushy Fork Coal Impoundment
 Burnsville Dam, Burnsville Lake, USACE
 Cumberland Dam, unnamed reservoir on the Potomac River, privately owned (on Maryland border)
 East Lynn Dam, East Lynn Lake, USACE
 Hannibal Locks and Dam, on the Ohio River, USACE (on the Ohio border)
 Hildebrand Lock and Dam, on the Monongahela River, USACE
 Jennings Randolph Dam, Jennings Randolph Lake, USACE (on the Maryland border)
 Little Beaver Dam, Little Beaver Lake, West Virginia Division of Commerce
 London Locks and Dam, on the Kanawha River, USACE
 Marmet Locks and Dam, on the Kanawha River, USACE
 Morgantown Lock and Dam, on the Monongahela River, USACE
 New Cumberland Locks and Dam, on the Ohio River, USACE (on the Ohio border)
 Opekiska Lock and Dam, on the Monongahela River, USACE
 Pike Island Locks and Dam, on the Ohio River, USACE (on the Ohio border)
 Power Plant and Dam No. 4, unnamed reservoir on the Potomac River, privately owned (on Maryland border)
 Power Plant and Dam No. 5, unnamed reservoir on the Potomac River, privately owned (on Maryland border)
 R. D. Bailey Dam, R. D. Bailey Lake, USACE
 Racine Locks and Dam, on the Ohio River, USACE (on the Ohio border)
 Robert C. Byrd Lock and Dam, on the Ohio River, USACE (on the Ohio border)
 Stonewall Jackson Dam, Stonewall Jackson Lake, USACE
 Summersville Dam, Summersville Lake, USACE
 Sutton Dam, Sutton Lake, USACE
 Tygart River Reservoir Dam, Tygart River Reservoir, USACE
 Wells Lock and Dam, on the Little Kanawha River, USACE (closed)
 Willow Island Locks and Dam, on the Ohio River, USACE (on the Ohio border)
 Winfield Locks and Dam, on the Kanawha River, USACE

References 

West Virginia
Dams
Dams